Walter Horton (April 6, 1921  – December 8, 1981), known as Big Walter (Horton) or Walter 'Shakey' Horton, was an American blues harmonica player. A quiet, unassuming, shy man, he is remembered as one of the premier harmonica players in the history of blues. Willie Dixon once called Horton 'the best harmonica player I ever heard'.

Robert Palmer named him as 'one of the three great harmonica soloists of modern blues with the two others being cited as Little Walter and Sonny Boy Williamson II. Also known as 'Mumbles', 'Shakey', along with 'Tangle Eye' and 'Shakey Head' (because of his head motion whilst playing the harmonica, along with his suffering from nystagmus). Horton was known for his unique tongue-blocking techniques and tone.

Biography

1920s 
Horton was born in Horn Lake, Mississippi. He claimed to be born in 1917, but his birth date is often cited as April 6, 1918. Various sources give the year as 1917 or 1921, although it is most likely he was born in 1921. He was playing the harmonica by the time he was five years old when his father gave him a harmonica as a gift. Horton dropped out of school at the age of seven. In his early teens, he lived in Memphis, Tennessee after moving there with his parents. He claimed that his earliest recordings were done there in the late 1920s with the Memphis Jug Band, but there is no documentation of them, and he would have been around six years old at the time of the recording sessions that took place in 1926, so this was likely fabricated by Horton. Some blues researchers agree that this is the case.

1930s 
In the 1930s he played with numerous blues performers in the Mississippi Delta region. Horton had already started playing on the streets for tips and the like. Johnny Shines, a childhood friend of Horton's, said, 'I met Walter, really, in 1930, and he would be sitting on the porch, blowing in tin cans, you know, and he'd get sounds out of those things'. Horton likely spent a short period of time in Chicago in 1938. It is generally accepted that he was first recorded in Memphis, backing the guitarist Little Buddy Doyle on Doyle's recordings for Okeh Records and Vocalion Records in 1939. These recordings were acoustic duets, in a style popularized by Sleepy John Estes and his harmonicist Hammie Nixon, among others. It can be heard—upon listening to players such as Hammie Nixon—that Horton was heavily influenced by such earlier styles of harmonica playing. On these recordings, Horton's style was not yet fully realized, but there were clear hints of what was to come.

1940s 
Horton eventually stopped playing the harmonica for a living, because of poor health (possibly tuberculosis), and worked mainly outside the music industry in the 1940s. He worked as a cook, ice man, and undertaker.  Walter Horton also met and gave lessons to harp players James Cotton and Little Walter in the 1940s. Horton is likely to have developed his musical skills during these times, considering the difference between the styles in his recordings from 1939 and those of the 1950s. Horton had a daughter named 'Christine' in 1945 or 1946 (along with 5 other children born in unknown years).  Walter started playing again in 1948, and then recording in 1951 and onwards.

1950s 
By the early 1950s, Horton was recording again (his first recordings of the decade being in 1951). Horton recorded with Joe Hill Louis in 1951. Horton was invited by Eddie Taylor to join Jimmy Reed's band in 1952, so he moved to Chicago. A couple of weeks after arriving, however, he was invited to join Muddy Waters' blues band when Junior Wells was drafted into the army at the end of 1952. Horton replaced him long enough to record on one session in January 1953. Horton was fired from the band by the end of 1953, likely due to his drinking and/or unreliability, and replaced by Henry 'Pot' Strong. After being fired from the Muddy Waters band, Walter moved back to Memphis and recorded again with Sam Phillips at Sun studios. Horton was among the first to be recorded by Sam Phillips, at Sun Records in Memphis. For his recordings for Sun, Horton was accompanied by the young pianist Phineas Newborn, Jr., who later was a well-known jazz pianist. Horton's instrumental track 'Easy', recorded around this time, was based on Ivory Joe Hunter's 'I Almost Lost My Mind'. During the early 1950s he appeared on the Chicago blues scene, frequently playing with Memphis and Delta musicians who had also moved north, including the guitarists Eddie Taylor and Johnny Shines. Horton went back to Chicago in 1954. In 1956, Horton recorded 'Walking By Myself', with Jimmy Rogers for Chess; some consider his solo in this song the best he ever recorded.

1960s 
Horton was active in the Chicago blues scene during the 1960s, as blues music gained popularity with white audiences. From the early 1960s onward, he recorded and frequently performed as a sideman with Taylor, Shines, Johnny Young, Sunnyland Slim, Willie Dixon and many others. Horton recorded his first solo album in 1964 as he was mainly known as a backing musician.

In October 1968, whilst touring the U.K., he recorded the album Southern Comfort with the guitarist Martin Stone (previously with Savoy Brown and later a member of Mighty Baby). In 1969, Walter recorded 'Johnny Shines with Walter Horton', where some of his best third position playing can be heard ('Sneakin' and Hidin' Part 1 and 2'). Along with this, Walter also recorded with Johnny Winter, J. B. Hutto and the Hawks, Koko Taylor, Fleetwood Mac, and J. L. Smith in 1969.

1970s 
Horton toured extensively in places such as Germany, Finland, and England. He toured usually as a backing musician and, in the 1970s, he performed at blues and folk music festivals in the United States and Europe, frequently with Dixon's Chicago All-Stars. He also performed on recordings by blues and rock stars.

In the late 1970s, if in town, Horton played the Sunday matinees at B.L.U.E.S, with Homesick James and Floyd Jones,(who had switched from guitar to bass), and he toured the United States with Homesick James Williamson, Guido Sinclair, Eddie Taylor, Richard Molina, Bradley Pierce Smith and Paul Nebenzahl, and he performed on National Public Radio broadcasts. Two of the compilation albums of his work are Mouth-Harp Maestro and Fine Cuts. Also notable is the album Big Walter Horton and Carey Bell, released by Alligator Records in 1972. He worked at blues festivals and often performed at the Maxwell Street market in Chicago. In 1977, he played on the Muddy Waters album I'm Ready, produced by Johnny Winter. He also recorded for Blind Pig Records during this period.

1980s 
Horton accompanied John Lee Hooker in the 1980 film The Blues Brothers. Although in the film his playing is actually overdubbed by Joe Berson as Horton was reportedly undone by the tedious cinematic process of multiple takes and abandoned the set. His final recordings were made in 1980. Horton died of heart failure in Chicago in 1981, at the age of 60, in a neighbor's apartment, and was buried in Restvale Cemetery, in Alsip, Illinois. Walter's death certificate also mentioned acute alcoholism.

Legacy 
Horton was renowned for his innovative contributions to the music of Memphis and Chicago.  His technique and tone continue to be studied and emulated by harmonica players around the world and he was heralded as one of the most brilliant and creative musicians ever to play the harmonica.

Horton was posthumously inducted into the Blues Hall of Fame in 1982.

In 2008, Horton was honored with a marker on the Mississippi Blues Trail in Horn Lake.

Other info 
Walter Horton has a daughter named Christine, who has children herself. Walter also named and recorded a song (in a similar style to 'Louise') for her in his 1970 album 'Big Walter Horton w/ Carey Bell'. Walter Horton was known to often tell tall tales, and would give lessons to his admirers. Walter Horton would always use Hohner Marine Band harmonicas.

Walter Horton's mother was Emma McNaire Horton, his father was Albert Horton, and he had 6 children and 8 grandchildren at the time of his death. Many of his relatives outlived him, including his parents. Walter Horton's wife was Fannie Horton.

Walter lived in near-poverty for most of his life. This was due to the fact that he was ignored by record companies and radio stations during his later life, without regular band or regular income. Like many of his peers, he lived on a meagre income during much of his career and endured racial discrimination in the racially segregated U.S. He lived in apartments most of his life, Bob Corritore said, “One time I went to Walter’s apartment to pick him up. It was a broken down rise made of wood and it appeared that he had a lot of family living there.”

Timeline of residency (references and the like in biography).

1921—1926: Horn Lake, Mississippi.

1927—1937/38: Memphis, Tennessee. Horton also moved through Arkansas at some point around this time.

1938: Chicago, Illinois.

1938/39—1952: Memphis, Tennessee. Recorded with Little Buddy Doyle in 1939 and then with Sam Phillips at sun records in 1951.

1952-1953: Chicago, Illinois. Joined Muddy Water's band during 1953 before being fired, periodically thereafter moving to Memphis to record again with Sam Phillips.

1953: Memphis Illinois.

1954—1981: Chicago, Illinois. Moved permanently to Chicago in 1954. Occasionally visiting Memphis in later years.

Discography

References

External links
Horton biography by Michael Erlewine
Illustrated Walter Horton discography

1921 births
1981 deaths
People from DeSoto County, Mississippi
American blues harmonica players
Blues musicians from Mississippi
Harmonica blues musicians
Juke Joint blues musicians
Chess Records artists
Okeh Records artists
Sun Records artists
Vanguard Records artists
Columbia Records artists
20th-century American musicians
P-Vine Records artists
Arhoolie Records artists
Cobra Records artists
Mississippi Blues Trail
Blind Pig Records artists
Alligator Records artists
Vocalion Records artists
Ace Records (United States) artists
20th-century African-American musicians
Burials at Restvale Cemetery